Anime Friends is a South American annual anime convention produced by Maru Division Corporation. It was originally held in São Paulo, Brazil during the month of July, and it expanded to Argentina (2009–17) and Chile (2013).

History

Brazil

Event history

Argentina

Event Story

Chile

Event Story

References

See also
 List of anime conventions

Anime conventions